Santiago Franco Tossi (born 4 September 1994) is an Argentine professional footballer who plays as a midfielder for Comunicaciones.

Career
Tossi began his career with Colegiales. After twenty-three appearances in three seasons, which included his senior bow versus San Telmo in April 2013, Tossi netted his first goal during a 2–0 win over Brown on 25 October 2014; another goal followed six days later versus Deportivo Merlo, as he scored twice in five games in 2014. Ninety-three matches and five goals occurred in four further seasons with Colegiales. In July 2018, Tossi joined fellow third tier club Comunicaciones. His first goals arrived in the succeeding December versus Sacachispas and Tristán Suárez.

Career statistics
.

References

External links

1994 births
Living people
Place of birth missing (living people)
Argentine footballers
Association football midfielders
Primera B Metropolitana players
Club Atlético Colegiales (Argentina) players
Club Comunicaciones footballers